Cyclohexanol is the organic compound with the formula HOCH(CH2)5. The molecule is related to cyclohexane by replacement of one hydrogen atom by a hydroxyl group. This compound exists as a deliquescent colorless solid with a camphor-like odor, which, when very pure, melts near room temperature.  Millions of tonnes are produced annually, mainly as a precursor to nylon.

Production
Cyclohexanol is produced by the oxidation of cyclohexane in air, typically using cobalt catalysts:
2 C6H12 + O2 → 2 C6H11OH
This process coforms cyclohexanone, and this mixture ("KA oil" for ketone-alcohol oil) is the main feedstock for the production of adipic acid.  The oxidation involves radicals and the intermediacy of the hydroperoxide C6H11O2H.
Alternatively, cyclohexanol can be produced by the hydrogenation of phenol:
C6H5OH + 3 H2 → C6H11OH
This process can also be adjusted to favor the formation of cyclohexanone.

Basic reactions
Cyclohexanol undergoes the main reactions expected for a secondary alcohol. Oxidation gives cyclohexanone, which is converted on a large scale in industry to the oxime, a precursor to caprolactam. As a laboratory exercise, this oxidation can be effected with chromic acid.  Esterification affords the commercially useful derivatives dicyclohexyladipate and dicyclohexylphthalate, which are used as plasticizers. Heating in the presence of acid catalysts converts cyclohexanol to cyclohexene.

Structure
Cyclohexanol has at least two solid phases. One of them is a plastic crystal.

Applications
As indicated above, cyclohexanol is an important feedstock in the polymer industry, firstly as a precursor to nylons, but also to various plasticizers. Small amounts are used as a solvent.

Safety
Cyclohexanol is moderately toxic: the Threshold Limit Value for the vapor for 8 h is 50 ppm. The IDLH concentration is set at 400 ppm, based on studies on the acute oral toxicity in animals. Few studies have been done on its carcinogenicity, but one study on rats found it to have co-carcinogenic effects.

References

Cyclohexyl compounds
Cycloalkanols
Nerve agent precursors